Jerry Robert Kajuga (1960 – before March 2007) was national president of the Interahamwe, the group largely responsible for perpetrating the Rwandan genocide against the Tutsi people in 1994. Born to a Tutsi father and a Hutu mother, Kajuga concealed his background and presented himself as being of pure Hutu descent. It was said that  being Tutsi, he nearly collaborated with Paul Kagame by helping the RPF Inkotanyi soldiers to infiltrate his Interahamwe for exterminating many Tutsis. This is notable as Hutu Power extremist groups considered Hutus who married Tutsis to be race traitors, and Kajuga went to great lengths to conceal his identity.

Biography 
Kajuga was born in Kibungo to a mixed-tribal family: his mother was Hutu and his father was Tutsi but had acquired false Hutu identity papers. He was  a young brother of  Huss Mugwaneza Kajuga, nicknamed  "millionaire of Rukara," the boss of SORIMEX-Rwanda, a company that manufactured tooth pastes and palmolive soap. To avoid any kind of suspicion about their family being Tutsi, Robert Kajuga kept his brother hidden at the Hôtel des Mille Collines in Kigali. According to Paul Rusesabagina, who managed the hotel, Kajuga was one of the many infiltrators within the Interahamwe sent by Tutsi rebel leader Paul Kagame.

Kajuga defended his participation in the genocide by arguing that Tutsis were responsible for trying to "take power" and stated "[w]e defended ourselves. Even the eleven-year-old children came with grenades. That’s why there are bodies at the roadblocks."

Kajuga fled Rwanda in July 1994, taking refuge in the nearby Democratic Republic of the Congo for two and a half years, before being arrested by UN Security forces and standing trial in Kigali and being sentenced to life imprisonment. Kajuga later died in prison sometime before March 2007 from an unspecified disease in Kinshasa.

References

Year of death missing
Tutsi people
Rwandan people convicted of war crimes
Rwandan prisoners sentenced to life imprisonment
1960 births

Rwandan genocide perpetrators